Danny F. Crawford (born ) is an American politician. He is a member of the Alabama House of Representatives from the 5th District, serving since 2016. He is a member of the Republican party.

References

Living people
Republican Party members of the Alabama House of Representatives
21st-century American politicians
1950s births
People from Athens, Alabama